István Baranya (9 February 1931 – 24 June 2007) was a Hungarian wrestler. He competed in the men's Greco-Roman flyweight at the 1956 Summer Olympics.

References

External links
 

1931 births
2007 deaths
Hungarian male sport wrestlers
Olympic wrestlers of Hungary
Wrestlers at the 1956 Summer Olympics
People from Hódmezővásárhely
Sportspeople from Csongrád-Csanád County